The United Kingdom has participated in the Eurovision Young Dancers 7 times since its debut in 1985, most recently taking part in 2005. The UK has hosted the contest once, in 2001 and jointly won the contest in 1989.

Participation overview

Hostings

Commentators

See also
United Kingdom in the Eurovision Song Contest – Senior version of the Junior Eurovision Song Contest.
United Kingdom in the Eurovision Dance Contest – Dance version of the Eurovision Song Contest.
United Kingdom in the Eurovision Young Musicians – A competition organised by the EBU for musicians aged 18 years and younger.
United Kingdom in the Junior Eurovision Song Contest – Singing contest for children aged between 9 and 14.

Notes and references

Notes

References

External links 
 Eurovision Young Dancers

Countries in the Eurovision Young Dancers